The 2016 Toppserien was the 30th season of the women's football top level league in Norway. LSK Kvinner FK were the defending champions and defended their title.

League table

Relegation play-offs
Medkila won the relegation play-offs 4–3 and 2–0 against Lyn and remained in the league.

Top scorers
.

References

External links
 Official website
 Season on soccerway.com

Toppserien seasons
Top level Norwegian women's football league seasons
Norway
Norway
1